, born  is a Japanese actor who portrayed Godzilla in the Heisei films, from 1984 to 1995.

Born in Kagoshima Prefecture, Satsuma began his acting career in the 1960s with small roles in samurai films. In 1971 he was offered the role of the smog monster antagonist Hedorah in Godzilla vs. Hedorah, opposite Haruo Nakajima as Godzilla. He went on to play Gigan in two further Godzilla films. When Nakajima retired from the Godzilla role in 1972, substitutes were hired between 1973 and 1975 until Satsuma took over permanently in 1984. His portrayal took the character away from the humour of the character's portrayals over the past decades, returning to the more animalistic Godzilla persona of the original 1954 film.

While filming Godzilla movies, Satsuma would regularly pass out on the set due to lack of oxygen while wearing the poorly ventilated and rubber suits; this was especially a problem during production of Godzilla vs. Destoroyah, in which the steam effect on the suit (meant to represent Godzilla undergoing a nuclear meltdown) was achieved using pure carbon dioxide.

Films
 Godzilla vs. Hedorah (1971) as Hedorah
 Godzilla vs. Gigan (1972) as Gigan
 Godzilla vs. Megalon (1973) as Gigan
 Zone Fighter (1973) as Gigan
 Prophecies of Nostradamus (1974)
 G.I. Samurai (1979) as vassal of the Koizumi clan
 The Return of Godzilla (1984) as Godzilla
 Pulgasari (1985) as Pulgasari
 Godzilla vs. Biollante (1989) as Godzilla
 Godzilla vs. King Ghidorah (1991) as Godzilla
 Godzilla vs. Mothra (1992) as Godzilla
 Godzilla vs. Mechagodzilla II (1993) as Godzilla
 Monster Planet Of Godzilla (1994) as Godzilla
 Yamato Takeru (1994) as Yamata no Orochi
 Godzilla vs. SpaceGodzilla (1994) as Godzilla
 Godzilla vs. Destoroyah (1995) as Godzilla (Misspelled as Kenhachiro Satsuma in the extended credits featured in the International version)

References

External links

 Roberto, John Rocco. Shigeko Kojima  (trans.) Winter 1999. "An Interview with Godzilla: Kenpachiro Satsuma", Kaiju Fan Online.
 

1947 births
Living people
Japanese male film actors
Actors from Kagoshima Prefecture